Krzysztof Artur Oliwa (pronounced ; born April 12, 1973) is a Polish former professional ice hockey player. He played as a left winger in the National Hockey League. To date, he is the only player from Poland to have won a Stanley Cup.

Playing career
Nicknamed "The Polish Hammer" and from the GKS Tychy youth system, Krzysztof Oliwa was drafted 65th overall in the 1993 NHL Entry Draft by the New Jersey Devils. An intimidating, physical player, he normally played the role of an enforcer and won the Stanley Cup with the Devils in 2000. Injuries prevented Oliwa from participating in the 2000 playoffs.  However, Oliwa played enough regular season games to qualify to have his name inscribed on the Stanley Cup, making him the first player born and exclusively trained in Poland to have this honor.

Oliwa later played for the Columbus Blue Jackets, Pittsburgh Penguins, New York Rangers, Boston Bruins and the Calgary Flames. He signed with the New Jersey Devils as a free agent after the 2003–04 season.  During the 2005–06 season, Oliwa was waived by the Devils and demoted to the minor league team in Albany.  However, he chose not to report. He retired at the end of the 2005–06 season, taking the coaching reins of the Polish National Hockey Program.

Coaching career
In 2014, Oliwa became the head coach of Kalkaska Rhinos Junior Hockey Team, but has since quit.

Career statistics

Regular season and playoffs

International

Awards and honors

Transactions
 June 12, 2000 – Traded to Columbus by New Jersey with future considerations (Deron Quint, June 23, 2000) for Columbus' 3rd round choice (Brandon Nolan) in 2001 Entry Draft and future considerations (Turner Stevenson, June 23, 2000).
 January 14, 2001 – Traded to Pittsburgh by Columbus for San Jose's 3rd round choice (previously acquired, Columbus selected Aaron Johnson) in 2001 Entry Draft.
 June 23, 2002 – Traded to NY Rangers by Pittsburgh for NY Rangers' 9th round choice (later traded to Tampa Bay - Tampa Bay selected Albert Vishnyakov) in 2003 Entry Draft.
 January 6, 2003 – Traded to Boston by NY Rangers for Boston's 9th round choice (later traded to San Jose - San Jose selected Brian Mahoney-Wilson) in 2004 Entry Draft.
 July 30, 2003 – Signed as a free agent by Calgary.
 July 15, 2004 – Signed as a free agent by New Jersey.
 October 1, 2004 – Signed as a free agent by Nowy Targ (Poland).

External links
 
 VIDEO Fights Oliwa

1973 births
Albany River Rats players
Boston Bruins players
Calgary Flames players
Columbus Blue Jackets players
Detroit Vipers players
GKS Tychy (ice hockey) players
Hartford Wolf Pack players
Living people
New Jersey Devils draft picks
New Jersey Devils players
New York Rangers players
People from Tychy
Pittsburgh Penguins players
Podhale Nowy Targ players
Polish ice hockey left wingers
Raleigh IceCaps players
Saint John Flames players
Sportspeople from Silesian Voivodeship
Stanley Cup champions